The Taylor Wessing Photographic Portrait Prize is an annual photographic portrait prize awarded by the National Portrait Gallery in London. It was established in 2003 as the Schweppes Photographic Portrait Prize. In the years 2006 and 2007 it was referred to simply as the Photographic Portrait Prize. In 2008 the name of the new sponsors, Taylor Wessing, was prepended to the prize name. Taylor Wessing's relationship with the Gallery began in 2005 with their sponsorship of The World's Most Photographed.

The prize is an open competition accepting submissions from amateur and professional photographers from anywhere. From about 6,000 submissions, 60 photographs are selected for exhibition at the National Portrait Gallery between November and February. A shortlist of usually four photographers receives prizes which in 2012 were: £12,000 for first; £3,000 for second; £2,000 for third; and £1,000 for fourth. The competition is judged by a panel chaired by the Director of the National Portrait Gallery. In addition, there is an independently sponsored prize for a specific category, usually young photographers.

Prize winners

Schweppes Photographic Portrait Prize 2003 

 Roben Antoniewicz
 Victor Albrow 
 Alan Powdrill
 Nadav Kander

The Deloitte Commission, for photographers 25 or under, was David Yeo.

Schweppes Photographic Portrait Prize 2004 

 Jens Lucking 
 James Reeve
 Angus Fraser 
 Henrik Knudsen

The Deloitte Commission, for photographers 25 or under, was Paul Plews.

Schweppes Photographic Portrait Prize 2005 

 Shara Henderson
 Philipp Ebeling
 Ric Bower 
 Magnus Reed

The Deloitte Commission, for photographers 25 or under, was Karoline Hjorth.

Photographic Portrait Prize 2006 

 Richard Boll
 Anna Bauer 
 Kiran Master
 Kyoko Hamada

The Deloitte Commission, for photographers 25 or under, was Erin Kornfeld.

Photographic Portrait Prize 2007 

 Jonathan Torgovnik 
 Julieta Sans 
 Michelle Sank 
 David Stewart 

The Godfrey Argent Award, for photographers 25 or under, was Ivor Pricket.

Taylor Wessing Photographic Portrait Prize 2008 

 Lottie Davies
 Hendrik Kerstens
 Catherine Balet
 Tom Stoddart

The Godfrey Argent Award, for the best portrait in black and white, was awarded to Vanessa Winship.

Taylor Wessing Photographic Portrait Prize 2009 

 Paul Floyd Blake
 Vanessa Winship
 Michal Chelbin
 Mirjana Vrbaski 

The Godfrey Argent Award, for photographers between 18 and 25, and the Elle commission was Ali Lomas.

Taylor Wessing Photographic Portrait Prize 2010 

 David Chancellor
 Panayiotis Lamprou
 Jeffrey Stockbridge
 Abbie Trayler-Smith

The Elle Commission was won by Clare Shilland.

Taylor Wessing Photographic Portrait Prize 2011 

 Jooney Woodward
 Jill Wooster
 Dona Schwartz
 Jasper Clarke 
 David Knight

The Elle Commission was won by Jasper Clarke.

Taylor Wessing Photographic Portrait Prize 2012 

 Jordi Ruiz Cirera
 Jennifer Pattison
 Spencer Murphy
 Alma Haser

The John Kobal New Work Award, for photographers under 30, was awarded to Matthew Niederhauser.

The judges were Sean O'Hagan (photography critic at The Guardian), Emma Hardy, Lauren Heinz (director of Foto8), Glyn Morgan (a partner at Taylor Wessing LLP), Sandy Nairne (director of the National Portrait Gallery) and Terence Pepper (curator of photographs at the National Portrait Gallery).

Taylor Wessing Photographic Portrait Prize 2013 

 Spencer Murphy
 Giles Price
 Anoush Abrar
 Dorothee Deiss

Taylor Wessing Photographic Portrait Prize 2014 

 First prize was awarded to David Titlow for "Konrad Lars Hastings Titlow"
 Second prize was awarded to Jessica Fulford-Dobson for "Skate Girl"
 Third prize was awarded to Birgit Püve for "Braian and Ryan"
 Fourth prize was awarded to Blerim Racaj for "Indecisive Moment"
The John Kobal New Work Award was awarded to Laura Pannack for "Chayla in Shul"

Taylor Wessing Photographic Portrait Prize 2015 

 First prize was awarded to David Stewart for "Five Girls 2014"
 Second prize was awarded to Anoush Abrar for "Hector"
 Third prize was awarded to Peter Zelewski for "Nyaueth"
 Fourth prize was awarded to Ivor Prickett for "Amira and her Children"
The John Kobal New Work Award was awarded to Tereza Cervenová for "Yngvild"

Taylor Wessing Photographic Portrait Prize 2016 

 First prize was awarded to Claudio Rasano for "Katlehong Matsenen 2016" from the series Similar Uniforms: We Refuse to Compare
 Second prize was awarded to Joni Sternbach for "16.02.20 #1 Thea+Maxwell" from the series Surfland
 Third prize was awarded to Kovi Konowiecki for "Shimi Beitar Illit" and "Tilly and Itty Beitar Illit" from the series Bei Mir Bistu Shein
The John Kobal New Work Award was awarded to Josh Redman for "Frances"

Taylor Wessing Photographic Portrait Prize 2017 

 First prize was awarded to César Dezfuli for a photograph of Amadou Sumaila
 Second prize was awarded to Abbie Trayler-Smith for a photograph of a girl fleeing Isis in Mosul, Iraq
 Third prize was awarded to Maija Tammi for a photograph of an android
The John Kobal New Work Award was also awarded to Tammi

Taylor Wessing Photographic Portrait Prize 2018 

 First prize was awarded to Alice Mann for "Drummies" (a series of four works). A prize of £15,000.
 Second prize was awarded to Enda Bowe for a photograph from the series Clapton Blossom. A prize of £3,000.
 Joint Third prize was awarded to Max Barstow for an untitled photograph and to Joey Lawrence for a photograph from the series Tombo's Wound. A prize of £2,000 each.

Taylor Wessing Photographic Portrait Prize 2019 

 First prize (£15,000): Pat Martin for two photographs from his series about his late mother, "Goldie (Mother)"
 Second prize (£3,000): Enda Bowe for "Neil", a portrait from a series exploring youth culture on either side of the Belfast peace lines
 Third prize (£2,000): Garrod Kirkwood for "The Hubbucks," a photograph of a family on route to Whitley Bay beach

Taylor Wessing Photographic Portrait Prize 2020 

 First prize (£15,000): Alys Tomlinson for portraits of Samuel, Jack and Jameela from the series Lost Summer
 Second prize (£3,000): Lydia Goldblatt for a photograph of a child in a tent in the garden
 Third prize (£2,000): Yolanda Y Liou for a portrait of the model, instagrammer and plus size advocate Enam Ewura Adjoa Asiama

Taylor Wessing Photographic Portrait Prize 2021 

 First prize (£15,000): David Prichard, for the series Tribute to Indigenous Stock Women
 Second prize (£3,000): , for the series Hakanai Sonzai
 Third prize (£2,000): Katya Ilina, for David, a portrait from the series Rosemary & Thyme

See also
Portrait Salon

References

External links
 
A selection of photographs from the 2019 competition at The Guardian

Photography awards
Photography in the United Kingdom
Annual events in the United Kingdom
2003 establishments in the United Kingdom
Awards established in 2003
National Portrait Gallery, London